The Oath of Tsuru San is an American silent short drama film starring William Garwood and Japanese actress Tsuru Aoki. It was released in October 1913.

References

External links
 

1913 films
1913 drama films
Silent American drama films
American silent short films
American black-and-white films
1913 short films
1910s American films